The Rear-front Memorial is a bronze and granite monument located in the city of Magnitogorsk, Russia, sculpted by Lev Golovnitsky and drawn by Yakov Belopolsky. It is considered the first part of a triptych, also consisting of The Motherland Calls in Volgograd and Warrior Liberator in Treptower Park, Berlin. This monument was unveiled in 1979. By the time of construction of the monument, the creator of the other two monuments, Yevgeny Vuchetich, had already died. 

The monument is composed of a worker and a warrior. The worker is oriented to the east, towards the Magnitogorsk Iron and Steel Works. The warrior is facing the west, to the side of the "Great Patriotic War". The three monuments are made to symbolize the sword being forged in Magnitogorsk, raised in The Motherland Calls in Volgograd (then Stalingrad) and finally dropped to the ground after the victory in Berlin as a part of Warrior Liberator. The composition also includes a stone flower made from Karelian granite with an eternal flame.

References

1989 sculptures
Bronze sculptures in Russia
Buildings and structures in Chelyabinsk Oblast
Colossal statues in Russia
Granite sculptures
Sculptures in the Soviet Union
Soviet military memorials and cemeteries
Statues in Russia
World War II memorials in Russia
Monuments and memorials in Russia
Objects of cultural heritage of Russia of regional significance
Cultural heritage monuments in Chelyabinsk Oblast